"Reach" is a song by American singer and actress Judy Cheeks, released in 1994 as the second single from her fifth album, Respect (1996). It was produced by Brothers In Rhythm, and peaked at number 17 on the UK Singles Chart and number 24 on the Billboard Hot Dance Club Play chart in the US. In 1996, it was re-released in a new remix which charted at number 22 in the UK. Both versions were successful in clubs, and the 1996 remix also reached number-one on the UK Club Chart.

Critical reception
Larry Flick from Billboard wrote, "To active clubgoers, this U.K.-brewed slice of disco/NRG melodrama has practically earned "classic" status. Finally available domestically, this anthem is ready to knock down a few top 40 and crossover radio doors. Cheeks has a presence that is, by turns, charming and commanding, holding up well against the track's busy arrangement of piano rolls and swirling strings. Dig into the half-dozen remixes and find the one that works for you." Pan-European magazine Music & Media stated, "Dance and gospel make a fine couple. Supported by backing vocals steadily growing to church choir proportions, Judy fills her cheeks to be heard on top of everything."

Chart performance
"Reach" became a massive club hit in Europe after its first release in 1994. It debuted at its highest position as number 17 on the UK Singles Chart on May 1, 1994. The following weeks the song dropped to number 23, 45, 70 and 97, with a total of 5 weeks in the chart. In the Netherlands, it reached number 13 on the Dutch Top 40 Tipparade and number seven on the Dutch Single Tip. On the Billboard Hot Dance Club Play chart in the US, it reached its best position as number 21 on June 25, 1994. It stayed within the chart for 8 weeks. In Canada, "Reach" peaked at number nine on the RPM Dance/Urban chart. In 1996, the song was remixed by Dancing Divaz (an alias of UK music producer Ian Bland) and peaked at number 22 in the UK on January 7. Then it dropped to number 34 and 53, before leaving the chart. But on Music Weeks RM Club Chart, it peaked at number-one on December 23, 1995.  

Track listing

 7", UK (1994)"Reach" (Brothers In Rhythm Radio Edit) — 3:48
"Can't Get Enough" — 4:28

 12", UK (1994)"Reach" (Brothers In Rhythm Club Mix) — 9:11
"Reach" (Mount Rushmore Attack That Track Vocal) — 6:32
"Reach" (Big Brother Mix) — 7:08
"Reach" (Mount Rushmore Attack That Track Dub) — 6:01

 12" single, UK (1995)"Reach" (Dancing Divaz Club Mix) — 7:13
"Reach" (Tommy's Club Mix) — 8:53
"Reach" (Quivver Vocal Mix) — 7:57
"Reach" (Pizzaman Dub) — 5:47

 CD single, Europe (1994)"Reach" (Brothers In Rhythm Radio Edit) — 3:48
"Reach" (Big Brothers Mix) — 7:08
"Reach" (Mount Rushmore Attack That Track Vocal) — 6:32
"Can't Get Enough" — 4:28

 CD maxi, US (1996)'
"Reach" (Brothers In Rhythm Original Radio Edit) — 3:46
"Reach" (Dancing Divaz Radio Edit) — 3:53
"Reach" (Brothers In Rhythm Club Mix) — 9:32
"Reach" (Dancing Divaz Club Mix) — 7:13
"Reach" (Tommy's Club Mix) — 5:47
"Reach" (Quivver Vocal Mix) — 7:57

Charts

References

1994 songs
1994 singles
1996 singles
House music songs
Positiva Records singles